This is a list of Granta magazine issues.

Issues

1979–1989

1990–1999

2000–2009

2010–2019

2020–present

External links 
 All issues – Granta.com

Literary magazines published in the United Kingdom
Lists of magazine issues